Rein Aren (25 December 1927 Tartu – 16 May 1990 Tallinn) was an Estonian actor.

In 1951 he graduated from GITIS' Estonian studio. From 1946 until 1949, he was a choir singer and ballet dancer at Vanemuine theatre. From 1951 until 1972, and again from 1979, he worked at Estonian Drama Theatre. From 1973 until 1979, he worked at Russian Theatre. Besides theatre roles he played also in several films. His younger brother was ballet dancer and actor Väino Aren.

Awards
 1966: Meritorious Artist of the 
 1982: People's Artist of the Estonian SSR

Filmography

 1955: Jahid merel
 1961: Ohtlikud kurvid
 1969: Punane telk
 1980: Pulmapilt
 1982: Corrida
 1984: Karoliine hõbelõng
 1984: Hundiseaduse aegu
 1989: Regina

References

1927 births
1990 deaths
Estonian male stage actors
Estonian male film actors
Estonian television actors
Estonian male radio actors
20th-century Estonian male actors
Male actors from Tartu
Burials at Metsakalmistu